John Jones (known as  (1782 or 1787 – 12 February 1863) was a Welsh Anglican priest and antiquarian.

Life
Jones, whose father was John Jones of Machynlleth, west Wales, was born at some time between 1782 (according to the age given his tombstone) and 1787 (according to Alumni Oxonienses). educated at Friars School, Bangor and Jesus College, Oxford.  He matriculated at Jesus College in 1804 and graduated in 1808.  He became a member of Lincoln's Inn in 1808.  After his ordination, he was curate of Llanfihangel Ysgeifiog, Anglesey, north Wales from 1809 to 1815, when he became curate of Llanfair is Gaer, Caernarfonshire.  In 1819, he was appointed rector of Llanllyfni, Caernarfonshire, where he was buried after his death on 12 February 1863.  His published writings, some using the pseudonym "", included seven sermons and antiquarian contributions to various journals and periodicals; some of his writings were published separately in 1822.  He was one of the first members of the Cambrian Archaeological Association.

References

1780s births
1863 deaths
Year of birth uncertain
19th-century Welsh Anglican priests
Welsh antiquarians
People educated at Friars School, Bangor
Alumni of Jesus College, Oxford